Kryukovo is a rural locality (a selo) in Posyolok Zolotkovo, Gus-Khrustalny District, Vladimir Oblast, Russia. The population was 15 as of 2010.

Geography 
Kryukovo is located 45 km east of Gus-Khrustalny (the district's administrative centre) by road. Lazarevka is the nearest rural locality.

References 

Rural localities in Gus-Khrustalny District
Melenkovsky Uyezd